Elvis Nolasco is an American film, stage and television actor known for his work on the ABC anthology series American Crime.

Early life 
Nolasco was born and raised in New York City and is of Dominican descent.<ref>{{Cite web|url=http://www.uptowncollective.com/2013/11/22/dominican-actor-elvis-nolasco-works-with-hollywood-director-spike-lee-again-in-the-film-oldboy-yahoo-voices/|title='DOMINICAN ACTOR ELVIS NOLASCO WORKS WITH HOLLYWOOD DIRECTOR SPIKE LEE AGAIN IN THE FILM 'OLDBOY|last=Medina|first=Jessica|date=22 November 2012|website=www.uptowncollective.com|publisher=|access-date=2019-04-11}}</ref>

 Career 
Nolasco has made appearances in a number of Spike Lee films including Clockers, Oldboy, and Da Sweet Blood of Jesus''.

In 2015, Nolasco portrayed Carter Nix in the first season of American Crime. He returned for the second season to play Chris Dixon, a public school principal.

Filmography

References

External links 
 

Living people
21st-century American male actors
Year of birth missing (living people)